Denis Burke (1904 – 25 July 1971) was an Irish Fine Gael  politician who served as a senator for 13  years. He was first elected in 1948 to the 6th Seanad, and held his seat until he stood down at the 1961 election.

Burke stood twice as a candidate for Dáil Éireann, in Tipperary South at the 1961 and 1965 general elections. He was unsuccessful on both occasions.

References 

1904 births
1971 deaths
Fine Gael senators
Members of the 6th Seanad
Members of the 7th Seanad
Members of the 8th Seanad
Members of the 9th Seanad
Politicians from County Tipperary